Isaac Franklin (May 26, 1789 – April 27, 1846) was an American slave trader and plantation owner. He was the co-founder of Franklin & Armfield, which became the largest slave trading firm in the United States. Based in Alexandria, Virginia, it also had offices in New Orleans and other Louisiana cities. Franklin owned six plantations in Louisiana and Tennessee. His Fairvue plantation, in Sumner County, Tennessee, was formerly listed on the National Register of Historic Places.

By 1841, Franklin left slave trading and devoted his energy to the plantations and other property interests. At the age of 50, he was married, for the first time, to Adelicia Hayes of Nashville. None of their four children survived to adulthood.

In the late 19th century, his widow eventually sold the Louisiana plantations. In West Feliciana Parish, his former Angola and other plantations were bought by the state in 1901 and converted for use as Louisiana State Penitentiary, the largest maximum-security prison in the United States.

Early life
Isaac Franklin was born on May 26, 1789, at Pilot's Knob Plantation on Station Camp Creek in Sumner County, Tennessee. His father James Franklin (1755-1825 or 1828) and grandfather Charles (1735-1769) both came from Baltimore, Maryland. James served in the Revolutionary War and was later listed by militia leader James Robertson as one of the "Immortal Seventy" who were granted one square mile or  each of land by the state of North Carolina for their service. (North Carolina then claimed Tennessee as part of its territory to the west.)

Isaac's mother was Mary Lauderdale. James Franklin prospered in Tennessee—as each of his sons reached adulthood, he presented them with a horse, a bridle, and a pocket knife. When Isaac was twenty-one years old, he received his share and, according to tradition, used the knife to carve a ship miniature. He sold this to a friend for one dollar. In fifteen years he had made a fortune in slave trading.

Career
Franklin took up slave trading in 1810. After serving in the War of 1812, Franklin resumed the trade.

In 1828 Franklin formed a partnership with his nephew John Armfield when Isaac's father James died and bequeathed land and slaves to him and his brother James. They set up Franklin & Armfield in Alexandria, then part of the District of Columbia.  Between 1828 and 1837, Franklin & Armfield became "the largest slave trading firm" in the United States.  Franklin's main sales office was in Natchez, Mississippi; he also had offices in New Orleans, the major slave trading center in the South, St. Francisville, and Vidalia, Louisiana. Franklin and Armfield joked with each other in letters about the enslaved women they were raping. They each had a child with a woman they had enslaved, and sold their children.

The firm owned six ships to take enslaved men, women, and children from Alexandria in the coastwise trade to the Deep South. The ships returned with cargoes of sugar, molasses, whiskey, and cotton.

Franklin made his Tennessee plantation, "Fairvue," his home. Once Fairvue was finished, he turned toward Louisiana, where he purchased six plantations, named "Bellevue", "Killarney", "Lochlomond", "Angola", "Loango" and "Panola"; much later, land of the combined plantations was used for Angola State Penitentiary. He also bought thousands of acres of land in Texas, as well as a turnpike, bank stock, and a third interest in the Nashville Race Course. After 1835, his activity as a slave trader reduced as he moved his efforts to his plantation interests. When he died in 1846, he owned  of land in Louisiana and more than 600 enslaved people.

Personal life
In 1839, at the age of fifty, he married socialite Adelicia Hayes (1817–1887), the daughter of Oliver Bliss Hayes (1783-1858), a lawyer and a Presbyterian minister, and Sarah Clemmons Hightower (1795-1871). By the time of his marriage to Hayes, Franklin had fathered a child with an enslaved woman named Lucinda who he had been consistently raping for about five years. Soon after this wedding Franklin sold the enslaved woman and her child, whose fates are unknown. Franklin and his wife Adelicia had four children: Victoria, Adelicia, Emma, and Julius Caesar.  All died in early childhood.

Upon his death in 1846, Franklin left his slave trading fortune, plantations, and slaves to his wife Adelicia. She later married again, and had Belmont Mansion and its estate built in what was then country outside Nashville in 1853. All of his children with Hayes died without heirs, so his only descendants are those of women he raped.

Death and legacy
Isaac Franklin died on April 27, 1846, in West Feliciana Parish, Louisiana. His corpse was preserved in alcohol and he was taken to Fairvue.

By a will he made in 1841, Franklin made a bequest to endow a school or seminary at Fairvue. The will was the subject of protracted litigation by his nephew and former partner Armfield.

His widow sold Fairvue to William Franklin and remarried the following year. She leased, and later in the 19th century sold, the Louisiana plantations to Samuel James, who leased convict labor (mostly black) from the state to work them. The state acquired the merged plantations under the name Angola in 1901; this land was used for the development of Angola Prison.

See also
Slavery in the United States#Slave trade

References

External links 
 

1789 births
1846 deaths
People from Sumner County, Tennessee
Businesspeople from Alexandria, Virginia
People from St. Francisville, Louisiana
American military personnel of the War of 1812
American planters
American rapists
American slave traders
American slave owners
Louisiana State Penitentiary